Distruction Boyz is a Gqom music duo from Durban, South Africa which consists of recording artists and record producers Thobani “Que” Mgobhozi and Zipho “Goldmax” Mthembu. Their debut album Gqom Is the Future was certified gold by RISA.

Early life 

Goldmax and Que were born in KwaMashu, the second biggest township in Durban. They established themselves by jamming to their own gqom and house sets at local taverns and shisa nyama’s in and around KwaMashu. Having run into each other a lot and appreciated each other’s playing styles at these kinds of local gigs, they then decided to merge their skills and form Distruction Boyz.

Career 
Distruction Boyz released their breakout single titled "Omunye" which features Benny Maverick now known by the name of Dladla Mshunqisi. The song was certified gold by the Recording Industry of South Africa. The duo then released their debut studio album titled, Gqom Is The Future on October 20, 2017, which was certified gold by RiSA on  December 18, 2017.  At the 2018 Dstv Mzansi Viewers Choice Awards the duo was nominated for Favourite Music Artist/Group. On November 1, 2019, they realeasd a single "Nevermind" featuring  Zhao.

Discography

Singles 
Pakisha

As lead artists

Studio albums

Production discography

Singles produced

Awards and nominations

South African Music Awards

|-
|2017
|Distruction Boys - Wololo (Dbanj Remix)
|Remix of the Year
|
|-
|2018
|Distruction Boys - Omunye
|Record of the Year
|

Soundcity MVP Awards Festival

|-
|2018
|Themselves
|Best Group/Duo
|

BET Awards Festival

|-
|2018
|Themselves
|Best International Act
|

Dstv Mzansi Viewers Choice Awards 

|-
|2018
| "Omunye"
| Favourite Song Of the Year 
|

References

External links 
 

Living people
Musicians from Durban
People from KwaZulu-Natal
South African musicians
South African boy bands
South African musical groups
South African record producers
Year of birth missing (living people)